Het Financieele Dagblad is a daily Dutch newspaper focused on business and financial matters. The paper was established in 1943. The company is headquartered in Amsterdam. It was among the newspapers participating in the Panama Papers investigation.

References

External links
 Official website

1943 establishments in the Netherlands
Business in the Netherlands
Business newspapers
Dutch-language newspapers
Mass media in Amsterdam
Daily newspapers published in the Netherlands
Newspapers established in 1943